Stephen Mark Flynn (born 13 October 1988) is a Scottish politician who has served as the leader of the Scottish National Party (SNP) in the House of Commons since December 2022. He has been the Member of Parliament (MP) for Aberdeen South since the 2019 general election.

In December 2022, Flynn announced his intention to run in the election to succeed Ian Blackford as the SNP Westminster leader. He defeated Alison Thewliss to become leader.

Early life 
Flynn was born in Dundee and was schooled in both Brechin and Dundee. An alumnus of the University of Dundee, he obtained both an MA (Hons) in the study of History & Politics, an MLitt in the study of International Politics & Security Studies, and an MSc in Global Shipping Management.

Political career
Flynn was first elected to Aberdeen City Council for the Kincorth/Nigg/Cove Ward in 2015 and served as leader of the SNP group on Aberdeen City Council from 2016 till his election to Parliament in 2019.

He succeeded Ross Thomson as MP for Aberdeen South, who announced in November 2019 that he would not contest the seat.

Following his election, Flynn was immediately appointed to the role of Shadow Chief Financial Secretary to the Treasury.

Flynn was promoted to the front bench in February 2021 as SNP Spokesperson for Business, Energy and Industrial Strategy.

SNP Westminster leader 

Following Ian Blackford's announcement on  that—at the Westminster Group's next AGM—he intended to stand down as the Westminster Group Leader, Flynn announced his candidacy and succeeded Blackford on 6 December. Flynn was elected by fellow Scottish National Party MPs, returning a 26-17 majority over candidate Alison Thewliss.

Initial speculation of a 'hostile takeover' by Flynn was denied by Flynn and Blackford, as well as by SNP Party Leader Nicola Sturgeon, who insisted that "it's not a coup".

PMQs 
Flynn made his debut PMQs appearance on 7 December, praising Blackford for his lengthy service and questioning Prime Minister Rishi Sunak on the energy crisis and Scottish independence.

Personal life 
Flynn has two children with his wife, Lynn.

He is a supporter of Dundee United Football Club, having been a season ticket holder since 1993, and named Bruce Springsteen as his dream dinner guest.

Flynn has suffered from a serious condition called avascular necrosis since his teens and underwent surgery for it in 2020.

References

External links 

 Profile on SNP website
 

1988 births
Living people
Alumni of the University of Dundee
Councillors in Aberdeen
Politicians from Dundee
Scottish National Party councillors
Scottish National Party MPs
UK MPs 2019–present